The Alijadores de Tampico (Tampico Lightermen) were a professional baseball club based in Tampico, Tamaulipas that played in the Mexican League between the 1940s and 1980s.

The Alijadores  were an excellent team and won titles in 1945 and 1946. However, they were not very profitable and did not play from 1949 through 1970. In 1971 the league reinstated the franchise, which played as the Estibadores de Tampico (Tampico Stevedores) during two seasons. Starting 1973, the team returned to its former name and won the championship title in 1975.

After 1979, Tampico was once again removed from the league. The franchise once again returned in 1983 and was renamed the Astros de Tampico for that season, playing again as the Alijadores in 1984. Since then, no other team based in Tampico has participated in Mexican professional baseball.

Notable players
21  All-time Mexican League great Héctor Espino helped win a Mexican League championship for the Alijadores de Tampico in 1975.

Year-by-year record

References

Defunct baseball teams in Mexico
Sports teams in Tamaulipas
Tampico
Baseball teams established in 1949
Baseball teams disestablished in 1985
Defunct Mexican League teams
1949 establishments in Mexico
1985 disestablishments in Mexico